The Knob (elevation ) is the fourth highest named point in the U.S. state of Indiana after Weed Patch Hill, Sand Hill, and Hoosier Hill. It is located in Bloomfield Township in LaGrange County, approximately three miles east of the town of LaGrange.

References 

Hills of Indiana
Landforms of LaGrange County, Indiana